Juha Markku "Whitey, Flying Finn" Widing (July 4, 1947 – December 30, 1984) was a Swedish professional ice hockey centre who was the third Finnish-born player (after Albert Pudas and Pentti Lund) to play in the National Hockey League (NHL). Widing played in the NHL for eight seasons, mostly with the Los Angeles Kings.

Playing career
Widing was born in Oulu, Finland, to a Finnish mother, Hilkka Widing. He moved to Sweden with his mother and Finland-Swedish stepfather, Yngve Widing, when he was four years old, and he received Swedish citizenship. In 1964 his family moved to Brandon, Manitoba, Canada, so he could play junior ice hockey for the Brandon Wheat Kings. He played three seasons there, improving his point total each season from 38 to 114 and then finally to 144 in only a 50-game schedule. Widing joined the New York Rangers of the NHL in 1969–70, thus becoming the first mostly European-trained player with a full-time contract in the NHL. However, after only 44 games he was traded to the Los Angeles Kings along with Réal Lemieux for Ted Irvine. In Los Angeles he developed into a legitimate scoring threat, garnering at least 55 points in five consecutive seasons. Kings' owner Jack Kent Cooke gave him the nickname "Whitey" and instructed his announcers to pronounce his last name as "why-ding" as opposed to the real pronunciation of "vee-ding." He often played on a line with Bob Berry and Mike Corrigan known as "the hot line."

However, by 1976 his productivity had dropped considerably, and he was traded to the Cleveland Barons the following season. In 1977–78, Widing played for the Edmonton Oilers of the World Hockey Association, scoring 42 points in his final professional season. After the season, he was traded to the Indianapolis Racers for Bill Goldsworthy, but chose instead to retire. Widing settled in British Columbia thereafter, but died following a heart attack on December 30, 1984, aged 37.

Career statistics

Regular season and playoffs

International

Awards and achievements
MJHL Second All-Star Team (1967)

References
Players: The Ultimate A-Z Guide of Everyone Who Has Ever Played in the NHL by Andrew Podnieks page 907 .

Notes

External links

1947 births
1984 deaths
Brandon Wheat Kings players
Cleveland Barons (NHL) players
Edmonton Oilers (WHA) players
Finnish ice hockey players
Los Angeles Kings players
New York Rangers players
Omaha Knights (CHL) players
Sportspeople from Oulu
Swedish ice hockey centres
Swedish-speaking Finns
Finnish emigrants to Sweden
Naturalized citizens of Sweden
Swedish emigrants to Canada
Swedish people of Finnish descent